Ilana Kara Diamond Rovner (born August 21, 1938) is a United States circuit judge of the United States Court of Appeals for the Seventh Circuit. Rovner was the first woman appointed to the Seventh Circuit. She was previously a United States district judge of the United States District Court for the Northern District of Illinois.

Early life, education and career

Rovner was born in Riga, Latvia. While an infant, she and her mother immigrated to the United States during World War II from Latvia to escape its occupation by Nazi Germany. She earned her Artium Baccalaureus degree from Bryn Mawr College in 1960. She studied at King's College London for one year and attended Georgetown University Law Center for two years before moving to Chicago. She received a Juris Doctor from Chicago-Kent College of Law in 1966. She was a legal researcher for Richard J. Phelan of Chicago, Illinois in 1971.

She was a law clerk for Judge James Benton Parsons of the United States District Court for the Northern District of Illinois from 1972 to 1973. She was an Assistant United States Attorney of the Northern District of Illinois from 1973 to 1977, serving as Deputy Chief of the Public Protection Unit from 1975 to 1976 and Chief of the Public Protection Unit from 1976 to 1977. She was a deputy governor and legal counsel for Governor James R. Thompson of Illinois from 1977 to 1984.

Federal judicial service
On June 19, 1984, President Ronald Reagan nominated Rovner to a seat on the United States District Court for the Northern District of Illinois vacated by Judge Joel Flaum. She was confirmed by the United States Senate on September 12, 1984, and received commission the same day. Her service was terminated on August 17, 1992, due to elevation to the Seventh Circuit.

On July 2, 1992, President George H. W. Bush nominated Rovner to a seat on the United States Court of Appeals for the Seventh Circuit vacated by Judge Harlington Wood Jr. She was confirmed by the United States Senate on August 12, 1992, and received commission on August 17, 1992.

Notable cases
On April 20, 2018, Rovner ruled against Trump's policy punishing sanctuary cities. She said allowing federal agencies to add conditions to grant funds without explicit congressional authority could lead to "tyranny." Rovner wrote, "The Attorney General in this case used the sword of federal funding to conscript state and local authorities to aid in federal civil immigration enforcement. But the power of the purse rests with Congress, which authorized the federal funds at issue and did not impose any immigration enforcement conditions on the receipt of such funds. It falls to us, the judiciary, as the remaining branch of the government, to act as a check on such usurpation of power."

Rovner was joined by William J. Bauer upholding the nationwide injunction against the policy. Daniel Anthony Manion partially dissented, saying he would narrow the injunction to protect only Chicago.

On August 27, 2019, Rovner joined David Hamilton in blocking Indiana's parental notification requirement for abortions. Michael Kanne dissented. On November 1, 2019, the 7th circuit denied en banc by a vote of 6–5, with Rovner in the majority. Frank Easterbrook, who provided a decisive vote, called on the Supreme Court to hear the case. In July 2020, the Supreme Court ordered a re-hearing in the case.

References

External links

1938 births
20th-century American judges
Alumni of King's College London
American people of Latvian-Jewish descent
Assistant United States Attorneys
Bryn Mawr College alumni
Illinois Institute of Technology alumni
Illinois lawyers
Illinois Republicans
Judges of the United States Court of Appeals for the Seventh Circuit
Judges of the United States District Court for the Northern District of Illinois
Latvian emigrants to the United States
Latvian World War II refugees
Latvian Jews
Living people
Politicians from Chicago
United States court of appeals judges appointed by George H. W. Bush
United States district court judges appointed by Ronald Reagan
Women in Illinois politics
Chicago-Kent College of Law alumni
20th-century American women judges